The 1978 USAC Mini Indy Series season was the second season of the USAC sanctioned Formula Super Vee championship.

Race calendar and results

Teams and drivers

Death of Tommy Thompson

African-American racingdriver Tommy Thompson participated in the ninth round of the championship at Trenton International Speedway. On the final lap of the 42-lap race one of the other competitor slowed down. John Barringer had to swerve to avoid contact. However Thompson hit Barringer. Thompson's left front wheel and Barringer's right rear wheel became locked. Both cars hit the wall head-on. Thompsons car was launched over the wall. Both Barringer and Thompson were transported to St. Francis Medical Center. Thompson succumbed to his injuries on 28 September.

Final standings

References

Indy Lights seasons
1978 in American motorsport